The 100 Guineas Cup, also known as the Hundred Guinea Cup (£100 Cup), or the Cup of One Hundred Sovereigns, was a regatta in 1851 which was the first competition for the trophy later named America's Cup. The trophy was valued at 100 pounds-sterling which led to its various names, all variations on 100 Pound Cup. The race was won by the yacht America, leading to the trophy being renamed "America's Cup". The official event known as "The America's Cup" was founded in 1857, when the deed of gift established the racing regattas. The 1851 competition was a fleet race, whereas modern America's Cups finals are match races.

History
The race originated with an invitation for the Great Exhibition of 1851 by the Earl of Winton, then Commodore of the Royal Yacht Squadron (RYS), inviting the recently formed New York Yacht Club (NYYC) to enjoy the facilities of the clubhouse of the RYS. John Cox Stevens, Commodore of the NYYC responded positively, and anticipated racing. Due to the RYS rules of the time, other races in the 1851 RYS Regatta were restricted to RYS members and their self-owned yachts, so the R. Y. S. £100 Cup was established, open to anyone to enter. At a RYS meeting on 9 May 1851, the race was scheduled for 22 August 1851. This race was to be the first of a series of challenge races for successive £100 Cups. At the time, it was normal practise for the winners to own the cups that were won, and not to return them for the next race to be won by others.

Trophy

The ewer was a stock item obtained from jeweler Robert Garrard in 1848. After the race, it was engraved with the names of the yachts that raced against America, except the runner-up Aurora.

Race
The regatta, held on 22 August 1851, raced clockwise around the Isle of Wight in a fleet race. The course was called "The Queen's Course". The course was near Cowes Castle on the Isle of Wight, where the Royal Yacht Squadron headquarters are located. The race took place as part of the 1851 Royal Yacht Squadron Regatta. The signal gun for sailing was fired at 10am, and the winner saluted by a gun from the flag-ship at 8:34pm (8:37pm railway time).

18 yachts were entered for the race, but only 15 yachts started the race. The yacht Fernande did not make the start, while Strella and Titania both got to the starting line, though did not start the race. Those yachts that raced were America, Alarm, Arrow, Aurora, Bacchante, Beatrice, Brilliant, Constance, Eclipse, Freak, Gipsy Queen, Ione, Mona, Volante, and Wyvern.

Gallery

Footnotes

References

America's Cup regattas
1851 in England
Sailing in England
History of the Isle of Wight
Sport on the Isle of Wight
August 1851 sports events